Philippe or Filip (born 15 April 1960) is King of the Belgians. He is the eldest child of King Albert II and Queen Paola. He succeeded his father upon the latter's abdication for health reasons on 21 July 2013. He married Mathilde d'Udekem d'Acoz in 1999, with whom he has four children. Their eldest child, Princess Elisabeth, is first in the line of succession.

Early life
Philippe was born on 15 April 1960 at the Belvédère Castle in Laeken north of Brussels. His father, Prince Albert, Prince of Liège (later King Albert II), was the second son of King Leopold III of Belgium and a younger brother of Baudouin. His mother, Paola, Princess of Liège (later Queen Paola), is a daughter of the Italian aristocrat Fulco VIII, Prince Ruffo di Calabria, 6th Duke of Guardia Lombarda. His mother descends from the French House of La Fayette, and the king is a descendant of Gilbert du Motier, Marquis de Lafayette, and Marie Adrienne Françoise de Noailles.

Philippe was baptised one month later at the church of Saint Jacques-sur-Coudenberg in Brussels on 17 May, and named Philippe after his great-great-grandfather Prince Philippe, Count of Flanders. His godparents were his paternal grandfather, King Leopold III, and his maternal grandmother, Donna Luisa, Princess Ruffo di Calabria.

Albert and Paola's marriage was unhappy, and they were usually absent from Philippe's life. The child neglect was so severe that child psychologist  described it as justifying intervention by social workers.

Philippe has a half-sibling, Princess Delphine of Belgium (born 1968).

Education
As a child the future king was required to move from a French-language school which he liked to a secondary school in Flanders, where he found it difficult to make friends. "In my youth, I had many problems at school", Philippe told teenage dropouts in 2019. "I felt badly treated. It was not easy for me". From 1978 to 1981, Philippe was educated at the Belgian Royal Military Academy in the 118th "Promotion Toutes Armes" (Promotion All Weapons). On 26 September 1980, he was appointed second lieutenant and took the officer's oath.

Philippe continued his education at Trinity College, Oxford, and he attended graduate school at Stanford University, California, where he graduated in 1985 with an MA degree in political science.
He obtained his fighter pilot's wings and his certificates as a parachutist and a commando. In 1989, he attended a series of special sessions at the Royal Higher Defence Institute. The same year, he was promoted to colonel.

In 1993, King Baudouin died in Spain, Albert became the new king, and Philippe became the new heir apparent, titled Duke of Brabant.

On 25 March 2001, Philippe was appointed to the rank of major-general in the Land Component and the Air Component and to the rank of rear-admiral in the Naval Component.

Marriage

Philippe married Mathilde d'Udekem d'Acoz, daughter of a Walloon count of a Belgian noble family and female line descendant of Polish noble families such as the princes Sapieha and counts Komorowski, on 4 December 1999 in Brussels, in a civil ceremony at the Brussels Town Hall and a religious ceremony at the Cathedral of Saint Michel and Saint Gudule in Brussels. They have four children were born at Erasmus Hospital in Brussels: 
Princess Elisabeth (born 25 Oct 2001)
Prince Gabriel (born 20 Aug 2003), 
Prince Emmanuel (born 04 Oct 2005), and 
Princess Eléonore (born 16 April 2008).

Foreign trade
On 6 August 1993, the government named Philippe as honorary chairman of the Belgian Foreign Trade Board (BFTB). He succeeded his father, who had been honorary chairman of the BFTB since 1962. On 3 May 2003, he was appointed honorary chairman of the board of the Foreign Trade Agency, replacing the BFTB.

In this capacity, Philippe has headed more than 60 economic missions. Upon his accession as seventh King of the Belgians, this role was taken over by his sister Princess Astrid.

Accession

King Albert II announced on 3 July 2013 that he would abdicate in favour of Philippe on 21 July 2013. Approximately one hour after King Albert II's abdication, Prince Philippe was sworn in as King of the Belgians. His eldest child, Princess Elisabeth, became his heir apparent and is expected to become Belgium's first queen regnant.

Reign

Philippe played a role in forming a coalition government after the 2014 Belgian federal election. Political meetings with the King were moved from the Palace of Laeken to the Royal Palace of Brussels. In May 2019, Philippe met with Vlaams Belang President Tom Van Grieken, the first time the party had received a royal audience.

In 2020, Philippe announced regret for the "acts of violence and cruelty" committed in Belgian Congo.

Honours and arms

National honours

Foreign honours

Arms

Ancestry

See also

 Line of succession to the Belgian throne
 Prince Philippe Fund

References

External links

 Official biography from the Belgian Royal Family website
 DHnet Article (French) about Prince Philippe's education and military career.

|-

|-

1960 births
21st-century Belgian monarchs
20th-century Roman Catholics
21st-century Roman Catholics
Royal Military Academy (Belgium) alumni
Alumni of Trinity College, Oxford
Belgian monarchs
Members of the Senate (Belgium)
Belgian people of Danish descent
Belgian people of German descent
Belgian people of Italian descent
Belgian people of Swedish descent
Belgian Roman Catholics
Roman Catholic monarchs
Dukes of Brabant
House of Belgium
Living people
People from Laeken
Princes of Saxe-Coburg and Gotha
Stanford University alumni

Grand Crosses of the Order of Aviz
Grand Crosses of the Order of Christ (Portugal)
Grand Crosses of the Order of Honour (Greece)
Grand Crosses Special Class of the Order of Merit of the Federal Republic of Germany
Grand Crosses of the Order of Merit of the Republic of Hungary (civil)
Grand Crosses of the Order of Merit of the Republic of Poland
Grand Crosses of the Order of the Liberator General San Martin
Knights Grand Cross of the Order of Isabella the Catholic
Knights Grand Cross of the Order of Orange-Nassau
Knights of the Golden Fleece of Austria
Knights of the Holy Sepulchre
Knights of Malta
Grand Croix of the Légion d'honneur
House of Saxe-Coburg and Gotha (Belgium)